A Lunar New Year film (Mandarin: hèsuìpiān, Cantonese: ho6seoi3pin3) refers to movies usually released during the Lunar New Year period.  It is a film that varies in genre (fantasy, comedy, action, animation, and the like) but whose style is generally relaxed and humorous. It is focused around the horoscope animal, theme, and other attributes for the upcoming year, taking these New Year ideas and presenting them in a modern and exciting way. A recent tradition, it has become a popular way to celebrate the New Year. In recent years, attendance at screenings for such films has grown during the holiday.

Introduction 
Folklorists believe "New Year's Movie Culture," or the first Lunar New Year films, can be traced back to the operatic players in the late Qing dynasty. During the New Year holidays, the stage boss gathered the most popular actors from various troupes and lete them perform repertories.

Early history 

The Chinese New Year films were first made in Hong Kong. Although the tradition is only about 30 years old, it has become a classic and now provides Hong Kongers with a sense of continuity and belonging. Film studios promote their new movies, with plans to roll out more advertising in mainland China in the coming year. The common themes of these films are the realities, the festivities, and the customs associated with the season.

In 1937, the first Chinese Lunar New Year film premiered in Hong Kong; the movie, titled Bloom and Prosper, broke all box office records. Because of the film's success, more followed in the 1950s and '60s, such as Marriage Between Poorness and Richness in 1963, Fortune in 1960,  Happiness at the Door in 1958,  Home Sweet Home in 1961, and May Luck be with You in 1965.

In the 1970s, the Kung Fu genre reached its height, coinciding with Hong Kong's economic boom. The film The 36th Chamber of Shaolin, received universal acclaim and is widely considered to be one of the greatest Kung fu films made until then; it is a highly influential film of the genre. Because of such success, kung fu films have become an important product of Hong Kong cinema. Even Jackie Chan, a famous actor known for his martial art movies, has the habit of watching a New Year's film every year.

Security Unlimited, a 1981 comedy directed by the Hui Brothers, is now considered the first modern Chinese New Year film in Hong Kong. The next year, Mad Mission ushered in a new epoch in movie star history; it is now recognized by audiences in other countries and regarded as one of the most successful movies among the Hui Brothers' comedies.

From the 1980s and the 1990s, the city's economic boom helped create its flourishing film industry. Movies made during this time include the "Aces Go Places" series, the "Winners and Sinners" series, "All's Well, Ends Well" series, and others.

List of Chinese New Year films

China mainland 
 The Dream Factory (1997)
 Pegasus (2019)
 Peppa Pig Celebrates Chinese New Year (2019)
 The Wandering Earth (2019)
 Detective Chinatown 3 (2021)
 Hi, Mom (2021)
 New Gods: Nezha Reborn (2021)
 The Battle at Lake Changjin II (2022)

Hong Kong 

 Security Unlimited (1981)
 Aces Go Places (1982)
 Happy Ghost (1984)
 It's a Mad, Mad, Mad World (1987)
 The Eighth Happiness (1988)
 God of Gamblers (1989)
 God of Gamblers II (1990)
 Dances with Dragon (1991)
 The Eagle Shooting Heroes (1993)
 The Heroic Trio (1993)
 Flirting Scholar (1993)
 A Chinese Odyssey (1995)
 Rumble in the Bronx (1995)
 Forbidden City Cop (1996)
 The God of Cookery (1996)
 All's Well, Ends Well (1997)
 Who Am I? (1998)
 Young and Dangerous 5 (1998)
 Be There or Be Square (1998)
 Gorgeous (1999)
 Sorry Baby (1999)
 Happy Times (2000)
 Big Shot's Funeral (2001)
 Chinese Odyssey 2002 (2002)
 Fat Choi Spirit (2002)
 Infernal Affairs (2002)
 Cell Phone (2003)
 Kung Fu Hustle (2004)
 The Promise (2005)
 After This Our Exile (2006)
 CJ7 (2008)
 72 Tenants of Prosperity (2010)
 I Love Hong Kong (2011)
 The Man from Macau (2014)

Taiwan 

 The Green Hornet (1994)
 David Loman (2013)
 Twa-Tiu-Tiann (2014)
 The Wonderful Wedding (2015)

Malaysia 

 Great Day (2011)
 Kongsi Raya (2022)
 Nasi Lemak 1.0 (2022)
 Small Town Heroes (2022)

Singapore 
 King of Mahjong (2015)
 Wonderful! Liang Xi Mei (2018)
 Ah Girls Go Army (2022)
 Reunion Dinner (2022)

References 

Cinema of China
Cinema of Hong Kong
Cinema of Taiwan